KERX (95.3 FM, "95.3 Max FM") is an American radio station licensed to serve the community of Paris, Arkansas. The station is owned and operated by Pearson Broadcasting. The broadcast license is held by Pearson Broadcasting of Paris, Inc.

KERX broadcasts an adult hits format to the greater Fort Smith, Arkansas, area.

The station was assigned the call sign "KERX" by the Federal Communications Commission (FCC) on May 3, 1993.

History

Until December 21, 2007, KERX carried a modern rock music format under the branding "The X". From 2007 through 2009, the station aired a classic rock format branded as "The Rebel".

References

External links

ERX
Adult hits radio stations in the United States